There have been two Buller baronetcies.

The baronetcy of Buller (later Buller-Yarde, Buller-Yarde-Buller and Yarde-Buller), of Churston Court, Devon, was created in the Baronetage of Great Britain on 13 January 1790 for Francis Buller. The second baronet assumed by Royal licence the surname of Yarde in 1800. The third baronet, Sir John Yarde-Buller, was created Baron Churston in 1858, with which title the baronetcy remains merged.

The baronetcy of Buller, of Trenant Park, Cornwall, was created in the Baronetage of the United Kingdom on 3 October 1808 for Rear-Admiral Edward Buller. It became extinct on his death in 1824.

Buller (later Buller-Yarde, Buller-Yarde-Buller and Yarde-Buller), of Churston Court (1790)
Sir Francis Buller, 1st Baronet (1746–1800)
Sir Francis Buller-Yarde-Buller, 2nd Baronet (1767–1833)
Sir John Yarde-Buller, 3rd Baronet (1799–1871) (created Baron Churston in 1858)

For later succession see Baron Churston.

Buller, of Trenant Park (1808)
Sir Edward Buller, 1st Baronet (1764–1824)

See also
Viscount Dilhorne

References

 

Baronetcies in the Baronetage of Great Britain
Extinct baronetcies in the Baronetage of the United Kingdom
Baronets